A corset is a support garment commonly worn to hold and train the torso into a desired shape, traditionally a smaller waist or larger bottom, for aesthetic or medical purposes (either for the duration of wearing it or with a more lasting effect), or support the breasts. Both men and women are known to wear corsets, though this item was for many years an integral part of women's wardrobes.

Since the late 20th century, the fashion industry has borrowed the term "corset" to refer to tops which, to varying degrees, mimic the look of traditional corsets without acting as them. While these modern corsets and corset tops often feature lacing or boning, and generally imitate a historical style of corsets, they have very little, if any, effect on the shape of the wearer's body. Genuine corsets are usually made by a corsetmaker and are frequently fitted to the individual wearer.

Etymology

The word corset is a diminutive of the Old French word cors (meaning "body", and itself derived from the Latin corpus): the word therefore means "little body". The craft of corset construction is known as corsetry, as is the general wearing of them. (The word corsetry is sometimes also used as a collective plural form of corset). Someone who makes corsets is a corsetier or corsetière (French terms for a man and for a woman maker, respectively), or sometimes simply a corsetmaker.

In 1828, the word corset came into general use in the English language. The word was used in The Ladies Magazine to describe a "quilted waistcoat" that the French called un corset. It was used to differentiate the lighter corset from the heavier stays of the period.

Uses

Fashion
The most common and well-known use of corsets is to slim the body and make it conform to a fashionable silhouette. For women, this most frequently emphasizes a curvy figure by reducing the waist and thereby exaggerating the bust and hips. However, in some periods, bodies (Tudor-era corsets) have been worn to achieve a tubular straight-up-and-down shape, which involved minimizing the bust.

For men, corsets are more customarily used to slim the figure. However, there was a period from around 1820 to 1835—and even until the late 1840s in some instances—when a wasp-waisted figure (a small, nipped-in look to the waist) was also desirable for men; wearing a corset sometimes achieved this.

An "overbust corset" encloses the torso, extending from just under the arms toward the hips. An "underbust corset" begins just under the breasts and extends down toward the hips. A "longline corset"—either overbust or underbust—extends past the iliac crest, or the hip bone. A longline corset is ideal for those who want increased stability, have longer torsos, or want to smooth out their hips. A "standard" length corset will stop short of the iliac crest and is ideal for those who want increased flexibility or have a shorter torso. Some corsets, in very rare instances, reach the knees. A shorter kind of corset that covers the waist area (from low on the ribs to just above the hips), is called a waist cincher. A corset may also include garters to hold up stockings; alternatively, a separate garter belt may be worn.

Traditionally, a corset supports the visible dress and spreads the pressure from large dresses, such as the crinoline and bustle. At times, a corset cover is used to protect outer clothes from the corset and to smooth the lines of the corset. The original corset cover was worn under the corset to provide a layer between it and the body. Corsets were not worn next to the skin, possibly due to difficulties with laundering these items during the 19th century, as they had steel boning and metal eyelets that would rust. Light linen or cotton shifts (also called chemises) were worn beneath corsets to absorb sweat and protect the corset and wearer from each other, and also to function as underwear and protect other garments from the wearer and their sweat. The corset cover was generally in the form of a light chemisette, made from cotton lawn or silk. Modern corset wearers may wear corset liners for many of the same reasons. Those who lace their corsets tightly use the liners to prevent burn on their skin from the laces.

People with spinal problems, such as scoliosis, or with internal injuries, may be fitted with a back brace, which is similar to a corset. However, a back brace is not the same thing as a corset. This is usually made of plastic and/or metal. A brace is used to push the curves so that they don't progress, and sometimes they lower the curves. Braces are used mostly in children and adolescents, as they have a higher chance of the curves getting worse. Artist Andy Warhol was shot in 1968 and never fully recovered; he wore a corset for the rest of his life.

Fetish

Aside from fashion and medical uses, corsets are also used in sexual fetishism, most notably in Bondage/Discipline/Sado-Masochism (BDSM). In BDSM, a submissive ( or "bottom") may be required to wear a corset, which would be laced very tightly and restrict the wearer to some degree. A dominant (or "top") may also wear a corset, often black, but for entirely different reasons, such as aesthetics. A specially designed corset, in which the breasts and vulva are exposed, can be worn during "vanilla sex" or BDSM activities.

Medical
A corset brace is a lumbar support that is used in the prevention and treatment of low-back pain.

Construction

Corsets are typically constructed of a stiff material, such as buckram, structured with boning (also called ribs or stays) inserted into channels in the cloth or leather. In the 18th and early 19th century, thin strips of baleen (also known as whalebone) were favoured for the boning. Plastic is the most commonly used material for modern corsets and the majority of poor-quality corsets. Spring and/or spiral steel or synthetic whalebone is preferred for stronger and generally better quality corsets. Other materials used for boning have included ivory, wood, and cane.

Corsets are held together by lacing, usually (though not always) at the back. Tightening or loosening the lacing produces corresponding changes in the firmness of the corset. Depending on the desired effect and time period, corsets can be laced from the top down, from the bottom up, or both up from the bottom and down from the top, using the bunny ears lacing method. Victorian corsets also had a buttoned or hooked front opening called a busk. If the corset was worn loosely, it was possible to leave the lacing as adjusted and take the corset on and off using the front opening. (If the corset is worn snugly, this method will damage the busk if the lacing is not significantly loosened beforehand). Self-lacing was how women would dress as help was usually unnecessary as long as a mirror was handy.

Comfort
In the past, a woman's corset was usually worn over a chemise, a sleeveless low-necked gown made of washable material (usually cotton or linen). It absorbed perspiration and kept the corset and the gown clean. In modern times, a tee shirt, camisole, or corset liner may be worn.

Moderate lacing is not incompatible with vigorous activity. During the second half of the 19th century, when corset wearing was common among women, sport corsets were specifically designed for wear while bicycling, playing tennis, or horseback riding, as well as for maternity wear.

Waist reduction

After 1998, the category changed to "smallest waist on a living person". Other women, such as Polaire, also have achieved such reductions ( in her case). However, these are extreme cases. Corsets were and are still usually designed for support, with freedom of body movement an important consideration in their design.

History 

For nearly 500 years, women's primary means of support were bodies, stays and corset, with boning made of reeds, whalebone, or metal. Researchers have found evidence of the use of corsets in the Minoan civilization of early Crete.

16th and 17th centuries
The corset has undergone many changes. Originally, it was known as "a pair of bodys" in the late 16th century. It was a simple bodice, stiffened with boning of reed or whalebone. A busk made of wood, horn, whalebone, metal, or ivory further reinforced the central front. It was most often laced in the back, and was, at first, a garment reserved for the aristocracy. Later, the term "pair of bodies" would be replaced with the term "stays" and was generally used during the 17th and 18th centuries. Stays essentially turned the upper torso into a cone or cylinder shape. In the 17th century, tabs (called "fingers") at the waist were added.

18th century

Stays evolved in the 18th century, during which whalebone was used more, and increased boning was used in the garment. The shape of the stays changed as well. While they were low and wide in the front, they could reach as high as the upper shoulder in the back. Stays could be strapless or use shoulder straps. The straps of the stays were generally attached in the back and tied at the front.

The purpose of 18th century stays was to support the bust and confer the fashionable conical shape, while drawing the shoulders back. At that time, the eyelets were reinforced with stitches and were not placed across from one another, but staggered. That allowed the stays to be spiral laced. One end of the stay lace was inserted into the bottom eyelet and knotted, and the other end was wound through the eyelets of the stays and tightened on the top. Tight-lacing was not the purpose of stays at that time. It was not possible until metal eyelets were introduced, in the mid-1800s. Women of all levels of society wore stays, from ladies of the court to street vendors.

During that time, there is evidence of a variant of stays, called "jumps", which were looser than stays and had attached sleeves, like a jacket.

Corsets were originally quilted waistcoats, which French women wore as an alternative to stiff corsets. They were only quilted linen, laced in the front, and unboned. That garment was meant to be worn on informal occasions, while stays were worn for court dress. In the 1790s, stays began to fall out of fashion. That coincided with the French Revolution and the adoption of neoclassical styles of dress. It was the men, so-called dandies, who began to wear corsets. The fashion persisted through the 1840s, though, after 1850, men who wore corsets claimed they needed them for back pain.

19th century

In the early 19th century, when gussets were added for room for the bust, stays became known as corsets. They also lengthened to the hip, and the lower tabs were replaced by gussets at the hip and had less boning. Shoulder straps disappeared in the 1840s for normal wear. In the 1820s, fashion changed again, with the waistline lowered to almost the natural position. That was to allow for more ornamentation on the bodice, which, in turn, saw the return of the corset to modern fashion. Corsets began to be made with some padding, for a waist-slimming effect, and more boning. Some women made their own, while others bought their corsets. Corsets were one of the first mass-produced garments for women. They began to be more heavily boned in the 1840s. By 1850, steel boning became popular.

With the advent of metal eyelets, in 1827 tightlacing became possible. The position of the eyelets changed. They were situated opposite one another at the back. The front was fastened with a metal busk. Corsets were mostly white. The corsets of the 1850s–1860s were shorter, because of a change in the silhouette of women's fashion, with the advent of the hoop skirt or crinoline. After the 1860s, as the crinoline fell out of style, the corset became longer, to shape the abdomen, exposed by the new lines of the princess or cuirass style.

In 1855, a woman named Frances Egbert had trouble with her corsets, due to the front steel pieces constantly breaking as a result of strain. Consequently, her husband, Samuel Barnes, designed "reinforced steels" for Egbert's corsets. Barnes filed a patent for the invention 11 years later, and Egbert collected the royalties on this patent for 15 years following his death. Following the case of Egbert v. Lippmann, the US Supreme court deemed Barnes's and Egbert's patent as "public".

For dress reformists of the late 19th century, corsets were a dangerous moral evil, promoting promiscuous views of female bodies and superficial dalliance with fashion whims. Health risks, such as damaged or rearranged internal organs, infertility, and inability to perform "womanly" duties, such as caring for children or cleaning house, were said to be caused by tightlacing, and that has been acknowledged by experts. However, tightlacing was very scandalous and was extremely uncommon. The large majority of women wore corsets every day without extreme detrimental effects. Eventually, the reformers' critique of the corset joined a throng of voices clamoring against tightlacing. Doctors counseled patients against it and journalists wrote articles condemning the vanity and frivolity of women who would sacrifice their health for the sake of fashion. While tightlacing is dangerous, it was fairly uncommon, and was seen as quite shocking by the majority of women, in addition to men. Whereas for many, corseting was accepted as necessary for health, support, and an upright military-style posture, dress reformers viewed tightlacing, especially at the height of the era of Victorian morality, as a sign of moral indecency.

American women active in the anti-slavery and temperance movements, with experience in public speaking and political agitation, wore sensible clothing that would not restrict their movement, although corsets were a part of their wardrobe. While supporters of fashionable dress contended that corsets maintained an upright, "good figure", and were a necessary physical structure for a moral and well-ordered society, dress reformers maintained that women's fashions were not only physically detrimental, but "the results of male conspiracy to make women subservient by cultivating them in slave psychology". They believed a change in fashions could change the position of women in society, allowing for greater social mobility, independence from men and marriage, and the ability to work for wages, as well as physical movement and comfort.

In 1873, Elizabeth Stuart Phelps Ward wrote:

Despite those protests, little changed in fashion and undergarments up to 1900. During the Edwardian period, the straight-front corset (also known as the S-Curve corset) was introduced. That corset was straight in front, with a pronounced curve at the back that forced the upper body forward and the buttocks out. The style was worn from 1900 to 1908, and was originally conceived as a health corset, which was a type of corset made of wool and reinforced with cording, and promoted the alleged health benefits of wearing wool next to skin. It was sold as an alternative to the boned corset. However, the S-Curve corset became the framework for many ornate fashions in the late 1890s and 1900s.

20th century

The corset reached its greatest length in the early 20th century. At first, the longline corset reached from the bust down to the upper thigh. There was also a style of longline corset that started under the bust, and necessitated the wearing of a brassiere, a style that was meant to complement the new silhouette. It was a boneless style, much closer to a modern girdle than the traditional corset. The longline style was abandoned during World War I.

The corset fell from fashion in the 1920s in Europe and North America, replaced by girdles and elastic brassieres, but survived as an article of costume. Originally an item of lingerie, the corset has become a popular item of outerwear in the fetish, BDSM, and Goth subcultures. In the fetish and BDSM literature, there is often much emphasis on tightlacing, and many corset makers cater to the fetish market.

Outside the fetish community, living history reenactors and historic costume enthusiasts still wear stays and corsets according to their original purpose to give the proper shape to the figure when wearing historic fashions. In this case, the corset is underwear rather than outerwear. Skilled corset makers are available to make reproductions of historic corset shapes or to design new styles.

In the late 1940s and early 1950s, there was a brief revival of the corset in the form of the waist cincher sometimes called a "waspie". This was used to give the hourglass figure as dictated by Christian Dior's "New Look". However, use of the waist cincher was restricted to haute couture, and most women continued to use girdles. Waspies were also met with push-back from women's organizations in the United States, as well as female members of the British Parliament, because corsetry had been forbidden under rationing during World War II. The revival ended when the New Look gave way to a less dramatically-shaped silhouette.

In 1968, at the feminist Miss America protest, protestors symbolically threw a number of feminine products into a "Freedom Trash Can". They included corsets, which were among items the protestors called "instruments of female torture", and accoutrements which they perceived to enforce femininity.

Since the late 1980s, the corset has experienced periodic revivals, all which have usually originated in haute couture and have occasionally trickled through to mainstream fashion. Fashion designer Vivienne Westwood's use of corsets contributed to the push-up bust trend that lasted from the late 1980s throughout the 1990s. Those revivals focussed on the corset as an item of outerwear rather than underwear. The strongest of the revivals was seen in the Autumn 2001 fashion collections and coincided with the release of the film Moulin Rouge!, in which the costumes featured many corsets as characteristic of the era. Another fashion movement, which has renewed interest in the corset, is the steampunk culture that utilizes late-Victorian fashion shapes in new ways.

Special types

There are some special types of corsets and corset-like devices which incorporate boning.

Corset dress

A corset dress (also known as hobble corset because it produces similar restrictive effects to a hobble skirt) is a long corset. It is like an ordinary corset, but it is long enough to cover the legs, partially or totally. It thus looks like a dress, hence the name. A person wearing a corset dress can have great difficulty in walking up and down the stairs (especially if wearing high-heeled footwear) and may be unable to sit down if the boning is too stiff.

Other types of corset dresses are created for unique high fashion looks by a few modern corset makers. These modern styles are functional as well as fashionable and are designed to be worn with comfort for a dramatic look.

Neck corset and collar

A neck corset is a type of posture collar incorporating stays and it is generally not considered to be a true corset. This type of corset and its purpose of improving posture does not have long term results. Since certain parts of the neck are being pulled towards the head, a band in the neck, called the platysmal band, will most likely disappear. Like the neck corset, a collar serves some of the same purposes. According to G. J. Huston, collars are worn to allow minimal neck movement after road accidents. Furthermore, he concluded that wearing a collar in order to improve the structure of the neck was more cheap than physiotherapy. Neck corsets and collars have become a fashion statement instead of assets to improve posture.

See also
Bralette
 Bustier
 Corset controversy
 Dudou, a Chinese undershirt sometimes known as a "corset"
 Fainting room
 Fetish clothing
 Gibson Girl
 Tightlacing
 Waist cincher

References

Further reading

External links

 
 
 Corsets at Chicago History Museum Digital Collections 
 The Secret History of the Corset and Crinoline—A seminar by the Victoria and Albert Museum
 Corsets in the collection of the Museum of New Zealand Te Papa Tongarewa
 Leicestershire County Council Museum's Symington Fashion Collection

Medieval European costume
 
16th-century fashion
17th-century fashion
18th-century fashion
19th-century fashion
20th-century fashion
Body modification
Cosmetic surgery
Fetish clothing
History of clothing (Western fashion)
Victorian fashion
Gothic fashion